Eric Greif (1962 – 2021) was an American lawyer and entertainment personality known for a management and record production career within the heavy metal musical genre in the 1980s and early 1990s, and later within the legal profession. He was also known for being the longtime manager and lawyer of metal musician Chuck Schuldiner. Canadian filmmaker Sam Dunn has referred to Greif as a "hugely important figure in the extreme metal scene." He was the nephew of deceased American-Irish writer and publisher Martin Greif.

On October 30, 2021, it was announced that Greif had died.

Early life
Greif was the weekly teen columnist with Southam News daily Calgary Herald but, wanting to be "where all the record labels were", left when he turned 18 for Los Angeles.  He attended the University of Sound Arts in Hollywood studying to become a recording engineer but soon switched to production when it was suggested to him by mentor Ron Fair.

Entertainment career 
Greif's first production work was with the Greg Leon Invasion, who he met after their show at The Troubadour and later managed.  Greg Leon subsequently introduced Greif to Tommy Lee, whom Leon had played in a band with, and this led to Greif's management work with Mötley Crüe. Among his arrangements was Mötley Crüe's eventful 1982 tour of Canada.

By the mid-1980s, Greenworld Distribution, who had worked with Greif on the marketing and distribution of Mötley Crüe's first album Too Fast for Love, had signed contracts with the vast majority of bands Greif brought to them with production deals, including Kansas City's Vyper, who he produced and managed. John Hughes, writing for the Kansas City Star, noted that "Mr. Greif hopes that Vyper will follow the pattern of last year's heavy metal meteor, Mötley Crüe, for which he was assistant manager and which recorded its first album with Greenworld...Billboard magazine announced the news in this week's issue". Quoting Greif, Hughes wrote "I'm going for millionaire status rather than blue-collar status. I'm marketing a product. The '80s is image, a look. The '80s are MTV". Greenworld's 1986 bankruptcy caused problems for Greif as Enigma Records, Greenworld's largest creditor, refused to return any of the master tapes and was not interested in promoting anything that Greenworld had been working on.

 Greif moved into concerts as co-promoter of Milwaukee Metalfest, described by MTV as "one of the largest celebrations of underground heavy metal in the country". He managed death metal pioneer Chuck Schuldiner and his Florida band Death, did some campaigning against US heavy metal media censorship, and produced bands such as Acrophet, Num Skull, Morbid Saint, Realm, Invocator, Viogression, Jackal, Twistin' Egyptians, Transmetal, Cyclone, Dr. Shrinker, and Morta Skuld. In September 1990, Greif held one of the first North American death metal festivals, Day of Death, in Milwaukee suburb Waukesha, Wisconsin, at the Expo Center and featured 26 bands including Autopsy, Hellwitch, Obliveon, Revenant, Viogression, Immolation, Atheist, Broken Hope, and Cynic.

Greif also managed LA band London, who at one time featured his former client Nikki Sixx, before their final break-up.

In November 1991, Journal Sentinel music writer Terry Higgins stated: "At 29, Greif has become the kingpin of a steadily growing rock empire by becoming the kind of tough businessman who is as much at home in the courtroom as in the boardroom". Although client Schuldiner had said about Greif "we just came to the conclusion that it was stupid just fighting all the time, taking each other to court and all that stupid shit", by the mid-1990s Greif decided he had spent enough time in court to know he wanted to become a lawyer.

Legal career

Eric Greif was an alumnus of the University of Calgary Faculty of Law and was a member of the Canadian Bar Association. Within legal practice, Greif was a co-founder of the Association of Restorative Practitioners of the UK and Ireland, delivered victim-offender mediation training to the Czech Republic Probation and Mediation Service (PMS) in Prague, and was a State Prosecutors facilitator at a conference of the European Forum for Victim-Offender Mediation and Restorative Justice in Belgium.

In entertainment endeavors, Greif has represented American guitarist/songwriter Paul Masvidal, Danish heavy metal guitarist Hank Shermann, and the bands Cynic, Obituary, Weapon, Anciients, and Massacre. He was the legal rep for the intellectual property of Chuck Schuldiner, and has submitted copyright claims to YouTube on behalf of Mutilation Music BMI for uploads of Death live footage. In latter 2012, Greif assisted metal documentarian and fellow Canadian Sam Dunn in logistics and raising funds for a short film on extreme metal, to be completed by late 2013. Dunn was quoted as saying "Eric Greif has been enormously supportive of our work. He is a hugely important figure in the extreme metal scene."

Personal life 
Greif said that he has always opposed the abuse of hard drugs, especially after seeing it "destroy" a few lives, including a former business partner who died after years of addiction.  Greif was an insulin-dependent diabetic for much of his life, which was briefly cured by a pancreas transplant in 2006, but "it failed a few months later and health continues to be a struggle for him", although he was a university lecturer and active in the music business.

References 

1962 births
2021 deaths
Talent managers
Canadian record producers
Lawyers in Alberta
People from Calgary
University of Calgary alumni
University of Calgary Faculty of Law alumni